Mary Rose Byrne (born 24 July 1979) is an Australian actress. She made her screen debut in the film Dallas Doll (1994), and continued to act in Australian film and television throughout the 1990s. She obtained her first leading film role in The Goddess of 1967 (2000), which brought her the Volpi Cup for Best Actress, and made the transition to Hollywood in the small role of Dormé in Star Wars: Episode II – Attack of the Clones (2002), followed by larger parts in Troy (2004), 28 Weeks Later (2007), and Knowing (2009).

Byrne appeared as Ellen Parsons in the legal thriller series Damages (2007–2012), which earned her two Golden Globe Awards nominations and two Primetime Emmy Award nominations. Get Him to the Greek (2010), Bridesmaids (2011), Spy (2015) and Instant Family (2018) established her as a comedic actress, in addition to the dramas and thrillers in which she continues to appear. She has since starred in a number of commercially successful comedies and dramas, including Insidious (2010) and its sequel Insidious: Chapter 2 (2013), X-Men: First Class (2011) and its sequel X-Men: Apocalypse (2016),  Annie (2014), as well as Peter Rabbit (2018) and its sequel Peter Rabbit 2: The Runaway (2021).

Early life
Byrne was born in Balmain, New South Wales, a suburb of Sydney. She has Irish and Scottish ancestry. Her parents are Jane, a primary school administrator, and Robin Byrne, a semi-retired statistician and market researcher. She is the youngest of their four children; she has an older brother, George, and two older sisters, Alice and Lucy. In a 2009 interview, Byrne stated that her mother was an atheist, while both she and her father were agnostic. Her family was described by The Telegraph as "close-knit", and frequently kept her feet grounded as her career took off. "At one point one of my sisters had a word with me saying, 'Watch yourself'", she once remarked. "But they were really supportive."

Byrne attended Balmain Public School and Hunters Hill High School before attending Bradfield College in Crows Nest, New South Wales. She later moved to Newtown, New South Wales and Bondi, New South Wales. Encouraged by one of her sisters, she began taking acting classes at age eight, joining the Australian Theatre for Young People. Growing up, Byrne experienced "plenty of rejection" from film schools. "I auditioned for a few of the big drama schools—Nepean, WAAPA, NIDA—and didn't get in to any of them. I was really disappointed with myself. I wasn't quite sure if I'd be legitimate without training for three years in a more traditional sense". Instead, she studied an arts degree at Sydney University.
"I still have great memories of those days: studying, working, auditioning. Just being a jobbing actor trying to figure out life after high school". In 1999, Byrne studied acting at the Atlantic Theater Company, which was developed by David Mamet and William H. Macy.

Career

1994–2006: Beginnings
Byrne obtained her first film role in Dallas Doll (1994) when she was 15 years old. Throughout the 1990s, she appeared in several Australian television shows, such as Wildside (1997) and Echo Point (1995), and starred as an alterna-girl love interest in the film Two Hands (1999), opposite fellow up-and-coming actor Heath Ledger. A role in the award-winning film My Mother Frank (2000) was followed by her first leading role in Clara Law's The Goddess of 1967 (also 2000), which gained her the Volpi Cup for Best Actress at the 57th Venice International Film Festival. Byrne revealed in a post-award interview that, prior to winning the Venice Film Festival Award, she was surprised by her own performance and found it confronting watching the film because her acting was "too depressing". Byrne admitted that "watching myself is confronting because I'm convinced I can't act and I want to get out, that's how insecure I am."

On stage, Byrne starred in La Dispute and in a production of Anton Chekhov's classic Three Sisters at the Sydney Theatre Company. In 2002, she made her first appearance in a Hollywood film with a brief appearance as Dormé, the handmaiden to Natalie Portman's Senator Padmé Amidala, in Star Wars: Episode II – Attack of the Clones. She also appeared in the 2002 thriller City of Ghosts, with Matt Dillon. Byrne had flown to the UK to shoot I Capture the Castle (2003), Tim Fywell's adaptation of the 1948 novel of the same title by Dodie Smith. In it, she portrayed Rose Mortmain, the elder sister of Romola Garai's Cassandra.

In 2003, Byrne starred in three Australian films; The Night We Called It a Day, with Melanie Griffith and Dennis Hopper; The Rage in Placid Lake, with Ben Lee; and Take Away, alongside Vince Colosimo, Stephen Curry, John Howard and Nathan Phillips. All films were comedies and opened to varying degrees of success at the box office, but The Rage in Placid Lake earned Byrne an AACTA Award nomination for Best Actress. In the epic drama Troy (2004), she took on the role of Briseis, the captured priestess presented to "amuse" Brad Pitt's Achilles. Variety'''s review of the film stated: "Byrne's spoils-of-war chattel plays more as a convenient invention than as a woman who could possibly turn Achilles’ head and heart around". In her other 2004 film release, the thriller Wicker Park, Byrne appeared, opposite Josh Hartnett and Diane Kruger, as the girlfriend of a young advertising executive's old friend. Wicker Park director Paul McGuigan described her as the best actress he has worked with, and her Troy co-star Peter O'Toole described her as "beautiful, uncomplicated, simple, pure actress and a very nice girl".

Byrne reunited with Peter O'Toole, playing a young servant, in the BBC TV drama Casanova (2005), a three-episode production about 18th century Italian adventurer Giacomo Casanova. In 2005, she also starred with Snoop Dogg in The Tenants, based on Bernard Malamud's novel. In 2006, Byrne portrayed Gabrielle de Polastron, duchesse de Polignac, a French aristocrat and friend of Marie Antoinette, in Sofia Coppola's Marie Antoinette, with Kirsten Dunst; and appeared as a medical examiner who thinks the dead woman she is prepping is her missing sister in the critically acclaimed thriller The Dead Girl, directed by Karen Moncrieff.

2007–2011: Breakthrough
In 2007, Byrne had significant parts in two studio sci-fi thriller films. She played a space vessel's pilot in Danny Boyle's Sunshine, alongside Cillian Murphy and Chris Evans, and also an army medical officer in Juan Carlos Fresnadillo's 28 Weeks Later, the sequel to Boyle's 28 Days Later. While Sunshine flopped, 28 Weeks Later was a critical success and grossed over US$64.2 million globally. In 2007, Byrne would begin playing Ellen Parsons, a bright, young attorney, in the FX legal thriller television series Damages, alongside Glenn Close. Her performance was widely praised, with Byrne being nominated twice for a Primetime Emmy Award for Outstanding Supporting Actress in a Drama Series in 2009 and 2010, and twice for a Golden Globe Award for Best Supporting Actress – Series, Miniseries, or Television Film in 2008 and 2010. She played her role in all fifty nine episodes of the series and until its finale in September 2012.

Following starring roles in the 2008 independent films Just Buried, directed by Chaz Thorne, and The Tender Hook, with Hugo Weaving, Byrne returned to the mainstream with the role of the mother of a teen, alongside Nicolas Cage, in the sci-fi thriller Knowing (2009), which made US$186.5 million worldwide and met with mixed reviews. Back then, Byrne was not being strategic about her film choices. "You gravitate to where you want to go, but so much is out of your control", she once remarked. After the success of Damages, she asked her agents to send her out for comedies. "I was doing all of this really heavy, dramatic stuff, and I just needed a break,” she stated. Her request was met when she obtained the role of a scandalous pop star and the on and off girlfriend of a free-spirited rock star in the comedy Get Him to the Greek (2010), also starring Russell Brand and Jonah Hill. Director Nicholas Stoller admitted that, in her audition, he thought: "'Why is she here?' Because, you know, very good actress, but very serious". Nevertheless, he noted that Byrne "just destroyed [...] Like, destroyed in the way that someone from Saturday Night Live would. And that was that". The film was a commercial success, with a gross of US$60.9 million in North America.

2011 marked a turning point in Byrne's career, as there were three high-profile films released theatrically featuring her in prominent roles that eventually would lead to a trajectory that included three to four films per year. In her first 2011 release, James Wan's horror film Insidious, she starred as one half of a couple whose son inexplicably enters a comatose state and becomes a vessel for ghosts in an astral dimension who want to inhabit his body. Budgeted at US$1.5 million, the film grossed US$97 million and marked the beginning of a whole franchise. The comedy Bridesmaids saw Byrne take on the role of the rich, beautiful, and elite wife of the groom's boss, alongside Kristen Wiig, Maya Rudolph, Melissa McCarthy, Ellie Kemper, and Wendi McLendon-Covey. Bridesmaids was both critically and commercially successful; it grossed US$26 million in its opening weekend, and eventually over US$288 million worldwide.

Byrne appeared in X-Men: First Class, directed by Matthew Vaughn, as Moira MacTaggert, a character she described as: "a woman in a man's world, she's very feisty and ambitious—you know, she's got a toughness about her which I liked". She said she was unfamiliar with both the comics and the film series, except for "what a juggernaut of a film it was". The actress was cast late into production, which had already begun by the time she was picked for the role. Her third and final 2011 film, First Class was also a box office success, grossing US$353.6 million around the globe.

2013–present: Continued comedic roles
Byrne had four film releases and one short film in 2013. She obtained the part of the newlywed wife, opposite Rafe Spall, in I Give It a Year, a comedy about the trials and tribulations of a couple during their first year of marriage. The Hollywood Reporter found Byrne and Spall to be "mismatched", while Variety praised their chemistry and noted: "Year will do nothing but enhance the reputations of its core actors, especially Byrne, who's shaping up into an ace comedienne perfectly suited to screwball". The film was a commercial success in the UK and Australia, where it was given a wide release in theatres. In The Place Beyond the Pines, a generational drama directed by Derek Cianfrance, she appeared with Ryan Gosling and Bradley Cooper, as the wife of a police officer who shoots a bank robber and has to deal with the consequences. She played a Google executive in the film The Internship, opposite Vince Vaughn and Owen Wilson, as she was drawn to "the way it addressed the generational gaps and the ever-changing landscape of the technological world".

Byrne filmed The Turning, a short film instalment in a Tim Winton omnibus feature, and worked again with fellow Australians Wan and Whannell for the sequel Insidious: Chapter 2, reuniting with Patrick Wilson and Lin Shaye. The film received mixed reviews from critics and became the biggest opening day in North America box office history for the month of September following its release. It eventually made over US$160 million against a budget of US$5 million. 2014 saw Byrne star in the family dramedies Adult Beginners and  This Is Where I Leave You as well as the comedy Neighbors, alongside Seth Rogen and Zac Efron, in which she played one half of a couple who come into conflict with a fraternity that has recently moved in next door. Critics highlighted her performance in Neighbors, with The Atlantic writing: "Byrne walks away with the film by making [her character] a well-rounded, conflicted person, rather than the film's fun cop who has to tell everyone the boring truth". The film was a box office success, taking in US$270.1 million worldwide.

A critically panned but commercially successful remake of the 1982 classic, Annie, was released in December 2014 and featured Byrne playing the role of Grace Farrell, the titular character's mother figure and Mr. Stacks' faithful personal assistant. In 2015, Byrne reunited with Melissa McCarthy and starred with Jude Law and Jason Statham in the hit comedic action film Spy, playing the daughter of an arms dealer, and also starred with Susan Sarandon in the dramedy The Meddler as the daughter of an ageing widow who moves to Los Angeles in hopes of starting a new life after her husband passes away. The film was acclaimed by critics and found an audience in limited release. In 2016, she reprised her roles in Neighbors 2: Sorority Rising and X-Men: Apocalypse, and in 2017, she filmed the black comedy I Love You, Daddy, directed by and also starring Louis C.K., but it was dropped by its distributor following sexual misconduct accusations made against C.K.

In 2018, Byrne voiced Jemima Puddle-Duck and played a local woman named Bea who spends her time painting pictures of the rabbits in the live-action comedy Peter Rabbit, which made US$351.2 million worldwide. She reprised her role in the 2021 sequel Peter Rabbit 2: The Runaway. In Juliet, Naked (also 2018), a romantic comedy adapted from Nick Hornby's novel of the same name, she appeared as a woman dating an obscure rock musician (played by Ethan Hawke). The film was an arthouse success, with Rotten Tomatoes' critical consensus reading: "Juliet, Naked's somewhat familiar narrative arc is elevated by standout work from a charming cast led by a well-matched Rose Byrne and Ethan Hawke." I Am Mother (2019) is a thriller and sci-fi movie with Clara Rugaard and Oscar winner Hilary Swank. Byrne also voiced a virtual assistant in the 2019 movie Jexi, costarring Adam Devine, Alexandra Shipp, and Wanda Sykes.

Public image

Byrne has been considered one of the world's most beautiful women. She ranked 9th and 16th in Australian FHMs "Sexiest Women in the World", in 2001 and 2006 respectively. She has been featured several times in "The Annual Independent Critics List of the 100 Most Beautiful Famous Faces from Around the World", ranking 15th (2004), 3rd (2005), 7th (2006), 5th (2007), 8th (2008), 1st (2009), and 15th (2010). She was also featured in the "Most Beautiful People" list of 2007 in Who Magazine, and ranked 5th in Hallmark Channel's 2008 "TV's Sexiest Leading Woman" poll. She was voted 78th on Ask Men's Top 99 'most desirable' woman of 2012 list, and People ranked her 7th in its "Best Dressed Celebrities" list of 2015. Byrne was the face of Max Factor between 2004 and 2009, and in 2014, she became the face of Oroton, the Australian producer of luxury fashion accessories.

Since the beginning of her career, her performances have been acclaimed by critics. In 2018, Byrne was noted for her comedic work. She consciously made the transition to less dramatic material in the late 2000s, finding the idea of being "boxed in" to be "insufferable". "You have to be aggressive in this business,” Byrne noted. "You have always got to push for what you want. Working with Glenn [Close, on Damages], she was the hardest worker ever. She was constantly pushing". Her turn to comedy led to The Hollywood Reporter calling her "the most in-demand supporting actress for comedies". Decider wrote a story titled "How Did Rose Byrne Become One of Our Best Comedic Actresses?", in which it was remarked: "Byrne's emergence as one of the brightest stars in the Apatowverse is all the more remarkable for her lack of a comedy background. [...] Any doubts about Byrne's massive comedic talent—and after Bridesmaids and Neighbors, you'd have to be pretty stubborn to still have doubts—were put to rest with 2015's Spy, where she again steals the show as merciless terrorist Rayna. Byrne and McCarthy's private-plane banter is the highlight of the film and could have gone on another 30 minutes as far as I'm concerned".

Personal life
In 2013, Byrne lived in New York and said she remained insecure about a stable career: "I don't think that insecurity ever leaves you. You're a freelancer. There's always an element of uncertainty."

Relationships
Byrne was in a relationship with Australian writer, director and actor Brendan Cowell for over six years. Cowell moved from Sydney to New York City, following Byrne's success on Damages''. Their relationship ended in January 2010.

Byrne has been in a relationship with American actor Bobby Cannavale since 2012. The couple have two sons, born in February 2016 and November 2017.

Activism
Byrne has supported UNICEF Australia by being the face of the 2007 Designers United campaign and a member of Tropfest jury in 2006 and Tropfest@Tribeca in 2007. She is a graduate and ambassador for NIDA's (National Institute of Dramatic Art) Young Actors Studio.

Filmography

Film

Television

Music videos

Stage

Awards and nominations

References

External links

 
 
 
Rose Byrne at Instagram

1979 births
20th-century Australian actresses
21st-century Australian actresses
Actresses from Sydney
Australian agnostics
Australian child actresses
Australian expatriate actresses in the United States
Australian film actresses
Australian people of Irish descent
Australian people of Scottish descent
Australian stage actresses
Australian television actresses
Australian voice actresses
Best Actress AACTA Award winners
Living people
University of Sydney alumni
Volpi Cup for Best Actress winners